Parens is a genus of moths of the family Erebidae erected by Michael Fibiger in 2011.

Species
Parens occi (Fibiger & Kononenko, 2008)
Parens paraocci Fibiger, 2011
Parens melli Fibiger, 2011
Parens chekiangi Fibiger, 2011

References

Micronoctuini
Noctuoidea genera